The Screaming Shadow is a 1920 American 15-chapter silent action film serial directed by Ben F. Wilson and Duke Worne. The film is considered to be lost. The serial's themes of "eternal life" and "premature burial" seem to tilt it into the horror genre as well. Actor/co-director Wilson died at age 54 in 1930 from a heart ailment.

Plot
A criminal organization called the Black Seven are after the secret of eternal life. They also seek world domination, and their first move in that direction is to seize the royal throne of Prince Rupert of Burgonia.

Cast
 Ben F. Wilson as John Rand (as Ben Wilson)
 Neva Gerber as Mary Landers
 Frances Terry as Nadia
 Howard Crampton as J.W. Russell
 Joseph W. Girard as Baron Pulska
 William Dyer as Jake Williams
 William A. Carroll as Harry Malone
 Fred Gamble as Fred Wilson
 Pansy Porter as Young maiden
 Claire Mille as Young maiden
 Joseph Manning as The butler

Chapter titles
 A Cry in the Dark
 The Virgin of Death
 The Fang of the Beast
 The Black Seven
 The Vapor of Death
 The Hidden Menace
 Into the Depths
 The White Terror
 The Sleeping Death
 The Prey of Mong
 Liquid Fire
 Cold Steel
 The Fourth Symbol
 Entombed Alive
 Unmasked

See also
 List of film serials
 List of film serials by studio
 List of lost films

References

External links

1920 films
1920 lost films
1920s action adventure films
1920s independent films
American action adventure films
American silent serial films
American black-and-white films
American independent films
Films directed by Ben F. Wilson
Films directed by Duke Worne
Lost American films
Lost action adventure films
1920s American films
Silent action adventure films
1920s English-language films